Ramon Elias Mujica Pinilla is a Peruvian anthropologist and served under three Presidents as Director of the National Library of Peru.

Early life
Ramon Mujica Pinilla is the son of Peruvian diplomat, founding publisher of Expreso de Lima and collector Manuel Mujica Gallo and museum docent Marisa Pinilla Sánchez Concha, daughter of Antonio Pinilla Rambaud a Spanish Consul of Spain in Peru. He graduated from New College of Florida in Sarasota, Florida. He did his postgraduate work at the National University of San Marcos.

Se llama Ramon

Career
He has written  books on the  mystical intellectual sources of St. Rose of Lima, the first saint of the Americas, and on the political dimensions of her Creole and Indian cult that prepared the ground for Peru's political Independence from Spain in 1821. Angeles Apocrifos en la America Virreinal includes an explanation for the late 17th century Andean sui generis baroque iconography of angels bearing musquets and Hebrew names. This angelic visionary iconography explained the Spanish Conquest of Peru in prophetic terms. It alluded to Inca Garcilaso de la Vega's belief that the Spanish conquistadors were divine messengers with thunderclaps sent by the Inca god Viracocha. Mujica coordinated  the two volume set on "El Barroco Peruano" published by the Banco de Credito del Peru  and the collection of essays "Vision y Simbolos: del virreinato criollo a la Republica Peruana", that includes contributions  by David A. Brading, Teresa Gisbert de Mesa and Natalia Majluf, among others.

He is a numerary  member (miembro de numero) of the Peruvian Academia Nacional de Historia and a "miembro correspondiente"  from  the Academia Nacional de Bellas Artes in Buenos Aires, Argentina. He has been appointed to be a board member of the Instituto Cervantes in 2014 filling a seat vacated by Isabella Allende.

References
Harvard Dept. of Art + Architecture Visiting Professor bio
El Commercio de Lima: Ramon Mujica appointed Director National Library of Peru

1956 births
Living people
National University of San Marcos alumni
New College of Florida alumni
People from Lima
Peruvian anthropologists
Peruvian essayists
Peruvian male writers
20th-century Peruvian historians
Peruvian librarians
Peruvian people of Spanish descent
Male essayists
21st-century Peruvian historians